Ngalula Sandrine Mubenga  is a Congolese engineer, a professor of electrical engineering technology, an entrepreneur, a philanthropist, and a government official leading electrification initiatives in the Democratic Republic of the Congo (DRC).  Her accomplishments as a Professor at the University of Toledo are detailed at www.DrMubenga.com. Research interests include renewable energy, solar power, electric vehicles, and battery management. Entrepreneurial credits include founding the SMIN Power Group LLC. The company specializes in the design and installation of renewable energy devices, with a primary mission to provide electrification for communities, schools and hospitals in her native country. As a Philanthropist, Mubenga has become a thought leader and socio-economic influencer in the (DRC) culminating in the founding of the STEM DRC Initiative in 2018 where she serves as President. With offices in Toledo Ohio and Kinshasa DRC, the STEM DRC Initiative is a 501(c)(3) not-for-profit organization which promotes STEM education and provides college scholarships for over 100 Congolese students studying in STEM fields. The organization supports interest in STEM fields as a means to stimulate social and economic development in the DRC.  As a government official, Mubenga served as a Director on the Board of Directors of Société Nationale d'Électricité (SNEL) since 2017 until her appointment as the Director General of the Electricity Regulatory Agency in the DRC by President Felix Tshisekedi in 2020.  In this capacity she leads regulatory initiatives to promote electrification as a means to spurring social and economic development in one of the poorest nations in the world.

Early life and education 
Mubenga was born in Kinshasa and is the daughter of a United Nations diplomat. She grew up in the Democratic Republic of the Congo, France, Senegal and in the United States. At the age of seventeen she was hospitalized with appendicitis, and needed surgery, but the city had run out of power. This near death experience inspired Mubenga to become an electronic engineer. Mubenga studied electronic engineering at the University of Toledo and graduated in 2005. She has three kids and a husband. Her master's research considered hybrid vehicles that included hydrogen fuel cells. In 2011 she became a licensed engineer. Her doctoral research, also at the University of Toledo, involved the development of a bilevel equaliser, and was the first to combine an active and low-cost passive equaliser. The equaliser could be used to extend the battery life of lithium-ion batteries.

Research and career 
Her research considers sustainable energy. After earning her doctorate she was appointed as an assistant professor at the University of Toledo.  

Mubenga founded the SMIN Power Group in 2011, which develops renewable energy solutions for people in Africa. Alongside their work in engineering, SMIN provides financial support to African students who study science and work on initiatives to tackle climate change.  To complement these scholarships, Mubenga launched the STEM DRC initiative, which looks to encourage African young people to become inspired by science and engineering. See www.StemDRC.org

Awards and honors 
Her awards and honors include:

 2009 Democratic Republic of the Congo Nkyoi Mérite
 2010 Institute of Electrical and Electronics Engineers Toledo Young Engineer of the Year Award
 2017 Africa's Most Influential Woman in Business
2017 Appointed to Board of Directors of Société Nationale d'Électricité (SNEL)
 2018 DesignNews Most Important Black Women Engineers
 2018 Institute of Electrical and Electronics Engineers Engineer of the Year
2020 Appointed Director General of the Electricity Regulatory Agency in the DRC

References 

 Living people
 Year of birth missing (living people)
American people of Democratic Republic of the Congo descent
 University of Toledo alumni
 University of Toledo faculty
 People from Kinshasa